Shelly C. Lowe is an American academic administrator serving as the chair of the National Endowment for the Humanities.

Early life and education 
Lowe is a citizen of the Navajo Nation and grew up on the central part of the reservation in Ganado, Arizona. She earned a Bachelor of Arts degree in sociology and Master of Arts in Native American studies from the University of Arizona.

Career 
Lowe has worked as executive director of the Harvard University Native American Program, assistant dean of Yale College, director of the Yale University Native American Cultural Center, and graduate program facilitator of the American Indian Studies program at the University of Arizona. She was appointed to serve as a member of the National Endowment for the Humanities by President Barack Obama in 2015 and as chair of the NEH by President Joe Biden in 2021. She was confirmed by the United States Senate on February 2, 2022, and sworn into office on February 14. She is the first Native American to head the NEH.

Selected publications

References 

Living people
University of Arizona alumni
People from Ganado, Arizona
Yale University administrators
Harvard University administrators
University of Arizona faculty
Chairpersons of the National Endowment for the Humanities
Year of birth missing (living people)